Achuguayo is the god of the Moon in Guanche religion in Tenerife. He was the duality of Magec (god of the sun). He was also called the "Father of Time", as he was in charge of regulating time.

References 
 Guanche Religion

Guanche gods
African mythology
Lunar gods
Time and fate gods